William King House may refer to:

William King House (Canal Winchester, Ohio), listed on the National Register of Historic Places listings in Franklin County, Ohio
William King House (Franklin, Tennessee), listed on the NRHP in Williamson County

See also
King House (disambiguation)